Ostoja may refer to:

 Ostoja, Łódź Voivodeship, a village in Poland
 Ostoja, West Pomeranian Voivodeship, a village in Poland
 Clan of Ostoja, a late medieval European clan
 Ostoja coat of arms
 Ostoja, masculine given name
 Ostoja Rajaković, Serbian medieval nobleman
 Ostoja Stjepanović, Macedonian footballer
 Stephen Ostoja of Bosnia, Bosnian king

See also
 
Ostojić

Slavic masculine given names
Serbian masculine given names